The 1961 South Dakota State Jackrabbits football team was an American football team that represented South Dakota State University in the North Central Conference during the 1961 NCAA College Division football season. In its 15th season under head coach Ralph Ginn, the team compiled an 8–2 record, tied for the NCC championship, and outscored opponents by a total of 376 to 97.

Schedule

References

South Dakota State
South Dakota State Jackrabbits football seasons
North Central Conference football champion seasons
South Dakota State Jackrabbits football